D.K.T.W.K. Palangasingh (born ) is a Sri Lankan male weightlifter, competing in the 56 kg category and representing Sri Lanka at international competitions. He participated at the 2014 Commonwealth Games in the 56 kg event and at the 2018 Commonwealth Games competing in the 62kg event.

Palangasinghe represented Sri Lanka at the 2022 Commonwealth Games in Birmingham, England.

Major competitions

References

External links

1993 births
Living people
Sri Lankan male weightlifters
Place of birth missing (living people)
Weightlifters at the 2014 Commonwealth Games
Weightlifters at the 2018 Commonwealth Games
Weightlifters at the 2022 Commonwealth Games
Commonwealth Games competitors for Sri Lanka
Weightlifters at the 2018 Asian Games
Asian Games competitors for Sri Lanka
20th-century Sri Lankan people
21st-century Sri Lankan people